Banya was the birth mother of King U of Goryeo.

Biography
Banya was a nobi serf of the Buddhist monk Sin Don. King Gongmin visited Sin Do often, and in the course of these visits, he slept with Banya, and she gave birth to a son in 1365. The Goryeosa, compiled by the following Joseon dynasty, states that Banya was a servant-turned-concubine of Sin Don and that the child was actually Sin Don's son. However, the veracity of these claims was questioned even in the Joseon period, and it is generally accepted that the boy, known as Monino, was indeed King Gongmin's son.

The Goryeosa records that King Gongmin banished Sin Don to Suwon in 1371, after which he named his son by Banya his heir. The boy was renamed U and recorded to be the king's son by a deceased palace maid of the Han clan. When Gongmin died in 1374, the boy became King U.

In 1376, Banya snuck into the residence of Queen Mother Myeongdeok, where she complained, 'I gave birth to the king, so how is it that his mother is of the Han clan?' The Queen Mother drove Banya out, and Banya was sentenced to imprisonment. At her sentencing, Banya pointed to the inner gate and shouted, 'if heaven knows of my resentment, this gate will surely collapse!' The gate then promptly collapsed, just as an official was about to walk through it. Despite this, Banya was thrown into the Imjin River, and one of her relatives was executed.

In popular culture
Portrayed by Seo Ji-hye in Sin Don.
Portrayed by Lee Yoon-ji in The Great Seer.

Notes

References

External links
 

14th-century births
14th-century deaths
14th-century Korean women
Year of birth missing
People executed by drowning
Korean slaves